Trumiejki  is a village in the administrative district of Gmina Prabuty, within Kwidzyn County, Pomeranian Voivodeship, in northern Poland.

The village has a population of 360.

See also
 History of Pomerania

References

Trumiejki